Julie Zenatti (born 5 February 1981) is a French singer. She first played the role of Fleur-de-Lys and later Esmeralda on stage for the musical Notre-Dame de Paris.

Personal life 
Zenatti was born in 1981 in Paris. She is of Algerian, Italian and Jewish descent. Her father is an accomplished amateur pianist, and used to accompany her singing on the piano. Zenatti was involved with Notre-Dame de Paris co-star Patrick Fiori from 2002 to 2006 and the pair were engaged for two years. In 2009, she served as a judge on the reality competition X Factor France.

Discography

Albums 
Studio albums

Live albums

Singles

*Did not appear in the official Belgian Ultratop 50 charts, but rather in the bubbling under Ultratip charts.

Featured in
2007: "Pour que tu sois libre (La rose Marie Claire)" (Leslie / Anggun / Jennifer Mc Cray / Natasha St Pier / Elisa Tovati / Julie Zenatti) (reached FRA #21)

References 

1981 births
Living people
Singers from Paris
21st-century French Jews
Jewish women singers
French people of Algerian-Jewish descent
French people of Italian descent
Zenatti, Julie
21st-century French women singers